Votskaya Oshya (Votyak Uşyaźı) is a rural locality (a selo) in Novoartaulsky Selsoviet, Yanaulsky District, Bashkortostan, Russia. The population was 135 as of 2010. There are 3 streets.

Geography 
Votskaya Oshya is located 27 km northwest of Yanaul (the district's administrative centre) by road. Varyashbash is the nearest rural locality.

References 

Rural localities in Yanaulsky District